The 2009–10 Los Angeles Kings season was the team's 43rd season (42nd season of play) in the National Hockey League (NHL). For the first time since the 2001–02 NHL season, the Kings qualified for the Stanley Cup playoffs.

Preseason 
The Kings were busy at the 2009 NHL Entry Draft, making five trades. The Kings chose Brayden Schenn as their first-round pick, fifth overall. The Kings finished the pre-season with a record of 4–3–1.  Defenseman Sean O'Donnell received a five-game suspension during the preseason after an incident involving New York Islanders forward Matt Martin. O'Donnell missed the final three pre-season games, and will miss the first two games of the regular season.

Luc Robitaille was inducted into the Hockey Hall of Fame on November 9, 2009.  Robitaille, who currently serves as the President of Business Operations for the Kings, was joined by Brian Leetch, Steve Yzerman, Brett Hull and Lou Lamoriello in this year's class of inductees.

Regular season 
The Kings observed a 17-day break in the schedule in February due to the 2010 Winter Olympics.  Five players currently under contract for Los Angeles were selected to represent their countries during the tournament.  Drew Doughty played for Canada, Michal Handzus played for Slovakia, while Dustin Brown, Jack Johnson and Jonathan Quick all represented the United States.

The main highlights for the club included them breaking an eight-year playoff absence by qualifying as the sixth seed in the Western Conference.  They finished the season with 101 points, the third highest point total in franchise history.  They also set a franchise record with a nine-game winning streak from January 21 through February 6. They registered two other eight game stretches without a loss.  On the road, they established franchise records for road wins in a season (24), road points (51) and the first ever 5–0–0 record on a five-game trip in franchise history.

Individually, goaltender Jonathan Quick established single-season records for victories with 39 and games played with 72.

Divisional standings

Conference standings

Schedule and results

Playoffs

The Los Angeles Kings qualified for the playoffs for the first time since 2002, clinching the sixth seed with 101 points.

Legend:

Player statistics

Skaters

Goaltenders 

†Denotes player spent time with another team before joining Kings. Stats reflect time with the Kings only.
‡Traded mid-season.
Bold/italics denotes franchise record.
Underline denotes currently with a minor league affiliate.

Awards and records

Records

Milestones

Awards

Drew Doughty was named as one of the three finalists for the James Norris Memorial Trophy awarded to the outstanding defenseman in the NHL.  The award will be handed out at the 2010 NHL Awards Show on June 23.  Doughty became the second youngest player in NHL history to be nominated for this award, with Bobby Orr being the youngest ever.  Doughty would be the second ever member of the Kings to win this award; Rob Blake is the only other member of the Kings to win this award.

Transactions 

The Kings have been involved in the following transactions during the 2009–10 season.

Trades

Free agents acquired

Free agents lost

Acquired via waivers

Lost via waivers

Player signings

Miscellaneous

|-

Draft picks 
Los Angeles' picks at the 2009 NHL Entry Draft in Montreal.

See also 
 2009–10 NHL season

Farm teams 
The Kings have one American Hockey League affiliate in the Manchester Monarchs. They also have one ECHL affiliate in the Ontario Reign. They have discontinued their affiliation with the Reading Royals. Both the Monarchs and the Reign are owned in part by the Kings' parent company Anschutz Entertainment Group.

References

External links 
2009–10 Los Angeles Kings season at ESPN
2009–10 Los Angeles Kings season at Hockey Reference

Los Angeles Kings seasons
L
L
LA Kings
LA Kings